Yeti: Giant of the 20th Century is a 1977 Italian-Canadian giant monster film directed by Gianfranco Parolini (as Frank Kramer), co-written by Parolini, Marcello Coscia, and Mario di Nardo, with special effects by Giovanni Cappelli, Nello Cappelli, Giuseppe Carrozza, Beniamino Carrozza, Amerigo Casagrande, Marcello Martinelli, Germano Natali, Augusto Possanza, and Fabio Traversari. An industrialist's orphaned grandchildren and their collie befriend an awakened Yeti.

Plot 

Industry tycoon Morgan Hunnicut asks his friend Professor Waterman to lead an expedition to study the giant Yeti creature found frozen in a large ice block on Newfoundland's coast. The professor does not know that Hunnicut intends to use the prehistoric creature as a trademark of its multinational industrial group. The expedition includes company representative Cliff Chandler and Morgan's grandchildren Jane and her younger brother Herbie, the latter of whom discovered the Yeti. The siblings' parents died in a plane accident, which Herbie was also in, but he survived and has been mute since.

The expedition thaws out and awakens the Yeti. However, their bright lights and camera flashes cause it to rampage, making everyone panic and rendering Jane and Herbie unconscious in the chaos. After the Yeti calms down, the children's dog Indio leads him to where they were left behind, and Jane and Herbie awaken to the Yeti towering over them. After looking at the children curiously, the Yeti takes them away, with Indio, Professor Henry, Cliff, and two other men following. After the Yeti sets the kids down, Jane sends Indio to find and lead the search party to them. Jane and Herbie discover the Yeti is friendly and befriend him as he shares fish with them. Upon seeing the kids with the Yeti, the professor believes their fur-lined and trimmed coats made the creature think they're also of his kind. Reuniting with Herbie and Jane, he also theorizes the Yeti has adopted them as family, seeing them as his son and wife, respectively.

Cast 

 Antonella Interlenghi as Jane Hunnicut
 Jim Sullivan as Herbert "Herbie" Hunnicut
 Tony Kendall as Cliff Chandler
 Edoardo Faieta as Morgan Hunnicut
 John Stacy as Henry Wassermann
 Aldo Canti as The Killer
 Donald O'Brien as Sergeant Stricker
 Mimmo Crao as Yeti

Production 
While RKO and Universal Pictures battled over King Kong's rights, Dino De Laurentiis, the producer for the 1976 King Kong remake would next produce another giant monster film which would be filmed in the Himalayas, entitled Yeti. David Z. Goodman wrote the screenplay, based on a story by Italian author Giorgio Moser.

References

External links 

 

1977 films
Canadian fantasy films
Italian fantasy films
1970s Italian-language films
1970s English-language films
English-language Canadian films
English-language Italian films
1970s monster movies
Giant monster films
Kaiju films
Films about Yeti
1970s Canadian films
1970s Italian films
1970s Japanese films